Mantis is the common name of any insect in the order Mantodea, also commonly known as praying mantises.

Mantis may also refer to:

Science and technology

Biology
 Mantis (genus), a genus of mantises
 Mantis shrimp, also known as stomatopods, predatory crustaceans
 Mantispidae or mantis-flies, small predatory insects whose front legs are similar to those of a praying mantis

Computing
 MANTIS, a programming language or an application generator marketed by Cincom
 Mantis Bug Tracker, a bug tracking system

Spacecraft
MANTIS (spacecraft), "Main-belt Asteroid and NEO Tour with Imaging and Spectroscopy", a proposed NASA spacecraft that would flyby multiple asteroids

Arts and entertainment
 Mantis (album), a 2009 studio album by progressive rock/jam band Umphrey's McGee

Comics
 Mantis (DC Comics), a supervillain in Jack Kirby's Fourth World
 Mantis (Marvel Comics), a member of The Avengers
Mantis (Marvel Cinematic Universe), the Marvel Cinematic Universe version of the character

Games
 Psycho Mantis, a boss in the videogame Metal Gear Solid
 Mantis, an alien insect-like race in the real-time strategy computer game Conquest: Frontier Wars
 Mantis, an alien race in the MMORPG Pirate Galaxy
 XF5700 Mantis, a space sim by MicroPlay in 1992
 The Mantis, an alien insect-like race in the roguelike computer game FTL: Faster Than Light

Film and television
 M.A.N.T.I.S., a superhero television series
 La Mante, a 2017 French miniseries

Military
 BAE Systems Mantis, an unmanned air vehicle developed by BAE Systems
 Nächstbereichschutzsystem MANTIS, a very short-range protection system of the German Army intended for base-protection

Other uses
 Jeremy Coney, former New Zealand cricket captain's nicknamed "The Mantis"
 Cagn, a god of the San of southern Africa, who often takes the shape of a praying mantis
 Mantis (roller coaster), a former stand-up roller coaster at Cedar Point
 Marcos Mantis, a British sports car
 Mantis, the ancient Greek word for seer or soothsayer, one cognizant of the will of divinity, which he learns through divination

See also
 UltraMantis Black, a professional wrestler, who performs primarily in the Chikara professional wrestling promotion
 Northern Praying Mantis, a martial art
 Southern Praying Mantis, a martial art
 Praying mantis (disambiguation)
 Mantissa (disambiguation)
 Manta (disambiguation)